= Messapeae =

Coordinates: 36°56′57″N 22°27′38″E

Messapeae or Messapeai (Ancient Greek: Μεσσαπέαι) was a village in ancient Laconia, containing a sanctuary of Zeus Messapeus.

Its site was identified by roof tiles of the 3rd century BCE stamped "Messapeos/Demosion" discovered in excavations in the 1960s at the church of the Metamorphosis in modern Anthochori south of Sparta. Other finds included pottery from the Early Helladic through Roman periods, and lead figurines suggesting the presence of a sanctuary, presumably that of Zeus Messapeus mentioned by the 2nd century CE traveler Pausanias (Book 3.20.3).
